Valleriite is an uncommon sulfide mineral (hydroxysulfide) of iron and copper with formula:  or . It is an opaque, soft, bronze-yellow to brown mineral which occurs as nodules or encrustations.

Discovery and occurrence
Valleriite was first described in 1870 from an occurrence in Västmanland, Sweden. It was named for Swedish chemist Johan Gottschalk Wallerius (Vallerius) (1709–1785).

Valleriite occurs in dunites and chromitites replacing chalcopyrite in Cyprus. In Phalaborwa, South Africa it occurs as replacement of magnetite in a carbonatite. It occurs as replacements of copper and nickel phases in serpentinites and other altered ultramafic rocks.

References

Copper minerals
Iron minerals
Magnesium minerals
Aluminium minerals
Sulfide minerals
Trigonal minerals
Minerals in space group 166
Minerals described in 1870